The Daneville Township Bridge No. E-26 is a historic stone arch bridge over an unnamed stream on 457th Avenue in rural Turner County, South Dakota, south of Viborg.   Built in 1935, it is one of a modest number of bridges surviving in the county that was built with New Deal funding.  It was listed on the National Register of Historic Places in 1999.

Description and history
It carries 457th Avenue, a rural dirt road, across an unnamed stream between 269th Street and South Dakota Highway 16. A headwall rises above the arch on each side, and extends into angled wing walls. It is built out of local quartzite fieldstone, with concrete coping topping the headwalls.

This bridge is one of 180 stone arch bridges built in Turner County as part of a New Deal-era federal jobs program. The county administration was able to build stone bridges at a lower cost than then-conventional steel beam bridges because of the availability of experienced stone workers, and the federal subsidy to the wages they were paid. The county was responsible for supervising the work crews and providing the building materials. This bridge was built in 1935 (as evidence by an incised marking on its side) by a county crew to a standardized state design.

See also
National Register of Historic Places listings in Turner County, South Dakota
List of bridges on the National Register of Historic Places in South Dakota

References

Bridges on the National Register of Historic Places in South Dakota
National Register of Historic Places in Turner County, South Dakota
Bridges completed in 1935
Transportation in Turner County, South Dakota
Buildings and structures in Turner County, South Dakota